Luis Cembranos Martínez (born 6 June 1972) is a Spanish retired professional footballer who played as a right midfielder, currently a manager.

He amassed La Liga totals of 155 games and 22 goals over the course of nine seasons, mainly with Espanyol and Rayo Vallecano. He also represented Barcelona in the competition.

Cembranos began working as a manager in 2007, with Huracán Z. He went on to be in charge of a host of clubs, as head coach as well as an assistant.

Playing career

Club
Born in Lucerne, Switzerland, Cembranos was the son of Spanish emigrants and returned to that country in his teens, moving to León. Having signed for FC Barcelona as a teenager, his professional career began in Catalonia at age 20, on loan with UE Figueres in the Segunda División. After a good handful of games he returned to the parent club, being assigned to the reserve side and going on to be deployed in several positions.

After having totalled 177 minutes in La Liga with Barça (his debut came against Racing de Santander on 10 September 1994, courtesy of manager Johan Cruyff) and having made his first and only UEFA Champions League appearance, away to Manchester United the following month– he also played with the B's that campaign – in early 1995 Cembranos moved to another team in the league and the region, RCD Espanyol. There, he first began to play regularly in the top division.

In another January transfer window move (January 1999), Cembranos joined Madrid's Rayo Vallecano, being an important member in his first months as they eventually returned to the top flight, scoring six goals during the (half)season. Both player and club continued to consolidate, and Rayo obtained their best-ever classification in 1999–2000, qualifying for the UEFA Cup via fair play.

Cembranos appeared very irregularly in his final three seasons, troubled with constant injuries that had already made him miss a good number of matches at Barcelona and Espanyol, mainly in the right knee. He was forced to retire in 2005 at age of 33 and, a couple of years after, he had his first coaching spell, with amateurs CD Huracán Z in Castile and León.

International
Courtesy of the best season of his career with Rayo (36 appearances, four goals), Cembranos earned his sole cap with Spain on 26 January 2000, when he came on as a substitute for Juan Carlos Valerón in the 76th minute of a 3–0 friendly win over Poland in Cartagena.

Coaching career
In the summer of 2011, Cembranos was appointed manager of Cultural y Deportiva Leonesa, promoting to Segunda División B at the end of his second season. On 19 June 2017, following two assistant spells, he returned to head coaching duties with Rayo Vallecano B.

Cembranos left for CD Leganés on 5 July 2019, taking over their reserves also in the Tercera División. On 21 October, after the departure of Mauricio Pellegrino, he was appointed at the first team in an interim manner. His first match in charge occurred five days later, a 1–0 home victory over RCD Mallorca which was their first of the campaign.

Managerial statistics

See also
List of Spain international footballers born outside Spain

References

External links

1972 births
Living people
Swiss people of Spanish descent
Swiss emigrants to Spain
Sportspeople from the Province of León
Sportspeople from Lucerne
Spanish footballers
Footballers from Castile and León
Association football midfielders
Association football utility players
La Liga players
Segunda División players
Tercera División players
FC Barcelona C players
FC Barcelona Atlètic players
UE Figueres footballers
FC Barcelona players
RCD Espanyol footballers
Rayo Vallecano players
Spain international footballers
Spanish football managers
La Liga managers
Segunda División B managers
Tercera División managers
Cultural Leonesa managers
CD Leganés managers